Cromie McCandless (17 January 1921 – 18 January 1992) was a Northern Irish Grand Prix motorcycle road racer. His best season was in 1951, when he finished in third place in the 125cc world championship behind Carlo Ubbiali and Gianni Leoni. McCandless won two Grand Prix races during his career. He was the brother of Rex McCandless who designed the successful featherbed frame used by the Norton Motorcycle Company.

References

1921 births
1992 deaths
Motorcycle racers from Northern Ireland
125cc World Championship riders
250cc World Championship riders
500cc World Championship riders
Isle of Man TT riders